Ludovico Technique LLC was an art and entertainment production company which produces a variety of media, from feature films, to comic books. Their name comes from the Ludovico technique, a fictitious brainwashing technique from both the novel and the film A Clockwork Orange.

DVD special edition work
Their DVD productions include the Columbia/Tri-Star DVD of The Usual Suspects and the UK edition (Winner: 2002 Cannes Film Festival Permanent DVD Collection); The Chronicles of Narnia: The Lion, the Witch and the Wardrobe DVD; the X-Men 2 DVD (nominated by the DVD Exclusives Academy for 2004 DVD Special Edition of the Year); The Lord of the Rings: The Two Towers 4-disc set (winner: 2004 DVD Special Edition of the Year); and the Tron 20th Anniversary Edition, nominated for both the 2003 DVD Exclusives Awards and Best Retrospective Documentary (for "The Making of Tron").

Ludovico Technique created the three-hour documentary Requiem for Krypton for the Superman Returns Special Edition DVD.

Feature films
In 2009, Ludovico Technique produced The Hills Run Red in association with Warner Premiere and Dark Castle Entertainment. Developed by Robert Meyer Burnett and frequent Ludovico contractor Dave Parker, the film began life as a micro-budget co-production with Fever Dreams, a division of the NYC-based MedaBlasters.   Burnett and Parker took control of the project and involved noted Splatterpunk author and screenwriter David J. Schow to do a page one rewrite of the original Fever Dreams script.  Following this, they produced a two-minute "teaser" trailer to sell Parker's directorial vision for the film. Impressed with their efforts, director Bryan Singer called Warner Premiere's Diane Nelson to inform her of the project.  Burnett and Parker then took their finished teaser and Schow's new draft of the script to Warner Premiere. The company picked the project to be the second film in their output deal with Dark Castle Entertainment, following up the initial release, Return to House on Haunted Hill.

Comics

Ludovico Technique also produce comic books. Published titles include Living in Infamy by Ben Raab and The Red Line.

External links
Official homepage (defunct)
Talking Infamy: The Big Honkin' Roundtable Interview Adam White of Comiccritique.com interviews Ludovico Technique staff members Ben Raab, Deric Hughes, Greg Kirkpatrick, Ashley Miller and Robert Meyer Burnett
An Audio Interview with Robert Meyer Burnett by SiDEBAR

Film production companies of the United States